Ghotak Eisa Khel is a village populated by Isa Khel Pashtuns in the Upper Orakzai Subdivision, now part of the Khyber Pakhtunkhwa province, Pakistan.

There is a primary school there.

References

 

Populated places in Orakzai District
Villages in Khyber Pakhtunkhwa